Family Jr. is a multiplex channel of the Canadian specialty channel Family Channel. It broadcasts children's programming aimed at viewers aged 2 to 7.

The channel launched on November 30, 2007 as a Canadian version of Playhouse Disney, under license from Disney Channels Worldwide (which had a library agreement with Family Channel at the time). It then rebranded under Disney's new preschool television brand Disney Junior in 2011. Following the acquisition of Astral Media by Bell Media, Family Channel—and by extension, Disney Junior—was divested to DHX Media (now WildBrain) in 2014.

In 2015, DHX lost its rights to Disney programming to Corus Entertainment: this resulted in the launch of a new Canadian Disney Junior channel, and DHX's existing Disney Junior channel being rebranded as Family Jr.–a brand extension of Family Channel–in September 2015.

Along with its French-language counterpart, Télémagino, it is available in over 4 million Canadian households as of 2013. As it is a multiplex channel of Family Channel (established when it was still legally considered a premium specialty service by the CRTC), the service is distributed at no additional charge to its subscribers.

History

As Playhouse Disney and Disney Junior

The channel originally launched as Playhouse Disney on November 30, 2007; as Family was originally licensed as a premium television service, it is allowed to operate multiplex channels consistent with the network's licence (which dictated that it provide a service with programming aimed at youth aged 17 and younger), thus the channel did not require separate CRTC approval, and would be offered at no additional charge to television providers who already carry Family Channel.

A French-language version, originally known as Playhouse Disney Télé, was launched on July 5, 2010. Unlike the English version, it operates under a separate Category B license.

On May 6, 2011, the networks were rebranded under Disney's new preschool television brand, Disney Junior.

On March 4, 2013, Bell Media announced that it would divest the Family Channel networks as part of its then-proposed acquisition of Astral Media. On November 28, 2013, DHX Media announced it would acquire the Family Channel networks $170 million, pending CRTC approval.  On July 24, 2014, the CRTC approved DHX's purchase of the networks, and the deal was closed on July 31, 2014.

As Family Jr.
On April 16, 2015, it was announced that Corus Entertainment had acquired rights to Disney's children's television library and brands, succeeding a previous license agreement with DHX. Corus stated that following the launch of a Canadian version of Disney Channel, it would re-launch Disney's other linear children's television brands in Canada in the future. In anticipation for this transition, DHX concurrently announced that its Disney-branded networks would be re-branded as spin-offs of Family Channel; Disney Junior was re-branded as Family Jr. on September 18, 2015. A Corus-owned incarnation of Disney Junior later launched on December 1, 2015.

Programming

Current programming

Canadian productions

 Caillou (February 5, 2018–present)
 Chip and Potato (October 15, 2018–present)
 Daniel Tiger's Neighborhood (September 4, 2017–present)
 The Fabulous Show with Fay and Fluffy (2022–present)
 Happy House of Frightenstein (2021–present)
 Justin Time (September 22, 2011–present)
 Kate & Mim-Mim (September 5, 2015–present)
 Kiwi & Strit (2022—present)
 Mighty Mike (April 1, 2019–present)
 Polly Pocket (July 8, 2018–present)
 Rev & Roll (September 2, 2019–present)
 Space Ranger Roger (January 9, 2017–present)
 Strawberry Shortcake: Berry in the Big City (October 17, 2021 – present)

Upcoming programming
 Powerbirds (TBA 2023)

Acquired programming

 Brave Bunnies (September 6, 2022–present)
 Care Bears: Unlock the Magic (October 7, 2019 – present)
 Curious George (September 18, 2015–present)
 Dog Loves Books (2020–present)
 DreamWorks Dragons: Rescue Riders (August 7, 2021–present)
 Grizzy and the Lemmings (March 24, 2018–present)
 Go Jetters (March 1, 2021 – present)
 Hey Duggee (November 2, 2020 – present)
 In the Night Garden... (April 11, 2016–present)
 Jungle Beat (2022–present)
 Lucas the Spider (October 16, 2021 – present)
 Madagascar: A Little Wild (January 9, 2021 – present)
 Norman Picklestripes (September 19, 2020 – present)
 Petronix Defenders (January 7, 2023 – present)
 Sunny Bunnies (July 2, 2018–present)
 Super Wings (2022–present)
 Teletubbies (December 19, 2015–present)
 Twirlywoos (September 5, 2015–present)

Former programming

 ALVINNN!!! and the Chipmunks
 Bananas in Pyjamas (February 19, 2013–February 2017)
 Bob the Builder
 Care Bears: Adventures in Care-a-lot (March 2010 – June 30, 2012)
 Dinotrux
 Elias: Rescue Team Adventures
 Franny's Feet (November 30, 2007 – February 4, 2018)
 Gerald McBoing-Boing (November 30, 2007 – July 31, 2011)
 Harry and His Bucket Full of Dinosaurs (November 30, 2007 – August 28, 2014)
 Henry's World (November 30, 2007 – September 27, 2013)
 Julius Jr. (May 2, 2015 – June 29, 2018)
 Trulli Tales (July 13, 2017 - January 25, 2018)
 Katie and Orbie (November 30, 2007 – December 31, 2012)
 King (November 30, 2007 – 2008)
 Kody Kapow
 Lalaloopsy (September 27, 2014 – August 28, 2016)
 Little People
 Mack & Moxy
 Messy Goes to Okido
 Nature Cat (July 1, 2016 – July 1, 2019)
 Noddy, Toyland Detective
 Pajanimals
 Playdate
 Rainbow Ruby
 Sarah & Duck (July 7, 2014 – September 1, 2019)
 The Save-Ums! (May 24, 2015 – September 1, 2018)
 The Secret World of Benjamin Bear (November 30, 2007 – August 30, 2015)
 Stella and Sam (January 9, 2011 – September 1, 2016)
 Strawberry Shortcake's Berry Bitty Adventures (2010–2020)
 Super Why! (November 7, 2016 – 2020)
 Thomas & Friends (May 24, 2015 – August 31, 2018)
 Tickety Toc (April 23, 2012 – July 30, 2018)
 Topsy and Tim
 Waybuloo (April 16, 2016 – September 1, 2018)
 Wow! Wow! Wubbzy! (July 20, 2009 – June 30, 2015)
 YaYa and Zouk (July 4, 2016 – September 1, 2019)
 Yo Gabba Gabba! (September 5, 2015 – September 1, 2019)
 Yup Yups (September 16, 2013 – 2018)

Playhouse Disney, Disney Junior, and Disney Channel programming 
Programs in bold indicate that the programs moved to new Disney Junior (Canadian TV channel)

 Bear in the Big Blue House (November 30, 2007 – September 30, 2013)
 Bunnytown (November 30, 2007 – 2012)
 Doc McStuffins (April 8, 2012 – August 30, 2015)
 DuckTales (October 2011–September 30, 2013)
 Handy Manny (November 30, 2007 – August 7, 2014)
 Henry Hugglemonster (April 21, 2013 – January 1, 2016)
 Higglytown Heroes (November 30, 2007 – September 30, 2013)
 Imagination Movers (2008–August 30, 2015)
 Johnny and the Sprites (November 30, 2007 – September 2, 2012)
 JoJo's Circus (November 30, 2007 – September 1, 2013)
 Jungle Junction (January 23, 2010 – August 30, 2015)
 Jake and the Never Land Pirates (May 2, 2011 – December 1, 2015)
 Minuscule (TV series) (October 30, 2006 - April 11, 2015)
 The Little Mermaid (November 30, 2007 – August 31, 2014)
 Little Einsteins (November 30, 2007 – January 1, 2016)
 Mickey Mouse Clubhouse (November 30, 2007 – September 17, 2015)
 Miles from Tomorrowland (February 21–August 30, 2015)
 My Friends Tigger & Pooh (November 30, 2007 – January 1, 2016)
 Out of the Box (November 30, 2007 – August 31, 2014)
 Sheriff Callie's Wild West (February 2, 2014 – December 1, 2015)
 Special Agent Oso (2009–January 1, 2016)
 Sofia the First (January 19, 2013 – August 31, 2015)
 Stanley (November 30, 2007 – September 27, 2013)

Related services

Family Jr. HD
On May 1, 2013, a high definition simulcast of Family Jr.'s (as Disney Junior) standard definition feed was launched.  It is available on Bell Aliant, Eastlink, Rogers Cable, SaskTel, Shaw Direct, and Telus Optik TV.

Family Jr. On Demand
Family Jr. On Demand is a video on demand service featuring programming from Family Jr, available to subscribers of Family. Family Jr. (as Disney Junior) launched its own On Demand channel on May 6, 2011.

Family Jr. Go
Family Jr. Go is a service available on the App Store and Google Play Store. It was initially only available to television customers of Shaw Cable and Shaw Direct, but expanded to other providers as years went by. It shows new and old episodes of Family Jr. programming and is part of the Family app.

See also
Treehouse TV
List of Canadian television channels

References

External links
 

WildBrain
Preschool education television networks
Television channels and stations established in 2007
2007 establishments in Canada
Analog cable television networks in Canada
Children's television networks in Canada
English-language television stations in Canada
Commercial-free television networks